Henry Blanton Parks (1856–1936) was an African American clergyman. He served as Bishop of the twelfth Episcopal district of the African Methodist Episcopal Church. In 1896–7 he was appointed secretary of the church's Missionary department.

References
J.T. Campbell, Songs of Zion: The African Methodist Episcopal Church in the United States and South Africa, Oxford University Press, 1995
T.W. Haigler, The life and times of Rt. Rev. H.B. Parks, presiding bishop of the twelfth Episcopal district of the African Methodist Episcopal Church, A.M.E. Sunday School Union, 1909

African Methodist Episcopal Church clergy
1856 births
1936 deaths